The Oxford Annotated Bible (OAB), published also as the New Oxford Annotated Bible (NOAB), is a study Bible published by the Oxford University Press. The notes and the study material feature in-depth academic research from nondenominational perspectives, specifically secular perspectives for "Bible-as-literature" with a focus on the most recent advances in historical criticism and related disciplines, with contributors from mainline Protestant, Roman Catholic, Jewish, and nonreligious interpretative traditions.

Editions and Biblical versions
The first edition of the OAB, edited by Rev. Dr. Herbert G. May and Dr. Bruce M. Metzger was published in 1962, based on the Revised Standard Version (RSV) of the Bible. In 1965, OUP published a matching edition of the deuterocanonical and apocryphal books as well as a version of the OAB including them. The deuterocanonical books are used by the Roman Catholic Church and the Greek and Slavonic Orthodox Churches, as well as churches of the Anglican Communion (including the Episcopal Church). In the same year, the OAB received the official imprimatur of Cardinal Richard Cushing for use by Roman Catholics as a study Bible. Later, the NOAB was also warmly welcomed by Orthodox leaders.

The first edition of the New Oxford Annotated Bible (NOAB) was published in 1973, employing the RSV text. After the release of the New Revised Standard Version (NRSV) of the Bible in 1989, OUP published a second edition of the NOAB based on that translation. The NRSV was also the basis of the third edition (2001), edited by Dr. Michael Coogan, which is considered to be much more ecumenical in approach. For example, it calls the Old Testament the "Hebrew Bible" out of consideration to Jewish readers.

In addition to the NRSV editions, the OUP continues to make May & Metzger's 1977 Revised Standard Version with the Apocrypha, Expanded edition available.

A fully revised Fourth Edition was released in May 2010. It contains new color maps and updated essays and commentaries. As always, versions with and without the Apocrypha were made available.

A fully revised Fifth Edition was released on April 1, 2018 with similar improvements.

See also
 Oxford Bible

References

Sources

External links 
 Oxford University Press study bibles

1973 in Christianity
1973 non-fiction books
British non-fiction books
Oxford University Press books
Study Bibles